Somatidia longipes is a species of beetle in the family Cerambycidae. It was described by David Sharp in 1878.

References

longipes
Beetles described in 1878